Fredrik Jensen (25 March 1921 – 31 July 2011) was a decorated Norwegian soldier in the German Waffen SS during World War II.

Born in Oslo, Norway, Jensen was the most highly decorated Norwegian on the Axis' side during World War II, being awarded the German Cross in Gold on 7 December 1944. He served in several Waffen-SS regiments, such as the SS-Panzergrenadier Regiment 4 Der Führer  in 2nd SS Panzer Division Das Reich and SS-Panzergrenadier-Regiment 9 Germania in 5th SS Panzer Division Wiking. He served on the southern front for the end of the war, with the rank of Obersturmführer and was arrested in hospital in Vienna. He was kept in the American prison in Dachau.

Jensen was sentenced to three months in jail under the legal purge in Norway after World War II, and was also sentenced to a loss of citizen's rights for ten years. After having served his prison sentence, he settled down in Sweden as a foreman and had great success in fabrication machinery. He later lived in Málaga in Spain. In June 2007, the Spanish press revealed possible contacts with the war criminal Aribert Heim. Jensen denied the accusation.

References

1921 births
2011 deaths
Military personnel from Oslo
Members of Nasjonal Samling
SS-Obersturmführer
Norwegian Waffen-SS personnel
World War II prisoners of war held by the United States
Norwegian prisoners and detainees
People convicted of treason for Nazi Germany against Norway
Norwegian emigrants to Sweden
Norwegian emigrants to Spain
Recipients of the Gold German Cross